Yendry Cony Fiorentino  (born 27 July 1993) known mononymously as Yendry  (stylized as ) is a Dominican singer and songwriter. Yendry first achieved popularity in Italy in 2012 thanks to her participation in the sixth edition of X Factor Italy which earned her a record deal with Sony Music Italy. From 2015 to 2018 she was the frontwoman of the group Materianera. In 2020 after the release of the singles Barrio and Nena she achieved international popularity and she signed a double record deal contract with RCA Records and Sony Music Latin. On April 15, 2021, she was one of the performers for the Latin American Music Awards of 2021. On June 7, 2021, she was nominated as Best New artst at the 2021 MTV Millennial Awards. On January 25, 2022, she received the nomination as Best New Female artist for the 2022 Premio Lo Nuestro.

Early life 
Yendry was born in Santo Domingo, Dominican Republic to a single mother, Rosa Maria Polanco. She grew up in Herrera, one of the poorest neighborhoods in the municipality of Santo Domingo Oeste. She lived in Herrera with her mother and grandmother until the age of three. Yendry and her mother then migrated to the city of Turin in Italy, for economic reasons. A few years later her mother got married and started a new family. Yendry’s stepfather adopted her and she grew up with brothers from her mothers second marriage. She began to discover her predisposition for music during the period of the liceo linguistico. She started to attend singing class alongside a modeling career that led her to participate in the regional selections of Miss Italia and then to win the title of Miss Deborah Piemonte in 2012. Also in 2012 she participated in the auditions of the sixth edition of X Factor, passed the selections and became part of the program, even if she didn't reach the semi-final she managed to get however a recording contract with  Sony Music Italy that she ended in 2014. From 2015 to 2018 she was the voice of the group  Materianera , again in 2018 she moved to London to work on her project as a solo artist in Spanish which will lead her to sign a double recording contract with  Sony Music Latin and RCA Records. Since 2020 she lives in Miami where she regularly carries out her singing career.

Career

2012–2014 : The Italian X Factor season 6 the first record deal with Sony Music Italy
In the summer of 2012, suggested by a friend she decided to take part to the audition of the sixth edition of X Factor Italia, at the audition she performed Video Games of Lana Del Rey and she gained the four yeses of the judges. She then successfully passes the bootcamp stages as well the home visit stage thus becomes an official contestant of the program for the category Under 24 Women led by Elio. She comes up to the fifth episode of the program, one step away from the semi-finals, eliminated by televoting, but despite the elimination she was approached by Sony Music Italy who offered her a record deal. In 2013 was released her debut single as Yendry Fiorentino entitled Here, a Dance pop song. The single does not achieve the desired results also due to the lack of promotion received. Not satisfied with the direction that the record company had decided for her and given the results obtained from her first single in 2014, Yendry decides to conclude the contract with Sony to undertake a path as an independent artist.

2015–2018 : The years as frontwoman of Materianera 
After the end of her contract with Sony Music Italy at the end of 2014, she met with the DJ and producer Alain Diamond and the musician Davide "Enphy" Cuccu, they formed the band Materianera for which Yendry is the frontwoman. The band mix trip hop, elettro and Alternative R&B. Materianera debut officially in 2015 through the label Tainted Music with the single Supernova who anticipated the homonym EP released on December 8 of the same year. In 2016 Yendry is one of the regular appearances as a backing vocalist in the program of Maurizio Crozza called Crozza nel Paese delle Meraviglie and in the same year she's also one of the backing vocalist for the Italian singer Dolcenera at the Sanremo Music Festival 2016. In 2016 Materianera they received a nomination at the Italian MTV Music Award after having been Artists of the month on January of the same year chosen by MTV New Generation. After the success of the debut EP, Materia near released in April 2017 their new single called Space, in February 2018 they released the single Hole in the Water the video of the song was shot in Naples in the quartieri spagnoli  the single anticipated the album Abyss released on March 16, 2018.  The album also marks the end of Materianera.

2019–2020 : The solo projects in Spanish and the new record deal with RCA Records and Sony Music Latin
After the experience with Materianera, Yendry started to work on her solo music project this time in Spanish to honor her Dominican heritage. She moved to London, met her manager Chris Hesketh, and signed with his company Blacksheep Music Management and with the independent label Liberator Music. In 2019 she started to travel between London and Los Angeles to record new music. In June 2019, she was the opening act for a London concert of Sean Paul. On December 6, 2019, she released her first single entitled "Barrio", produced by B-CROMA and written by Yendry herself. The song, inspired by Yendry's mother's story, is an anthem to the independence and freedom of women represented in the official video, directed and produced by MYBOSSWAS, in which the story represented is that of a young mother who is a victim of abuse, and who decides to free herself thanks to her supernatural powers. On April 10, 2020, she released the single Nena, produced by Jermia Jones and written by Yendry herself, the song is a Latin ballad with R&B elements, is a very autobiographical song that tells the story of Yendry's mother Rosa and of the moment of separation when she was forced to emigrate to Italy in search of a job leaving her two-year-old daughter Yendry with the grandmother Ramona, The story is also represented in the official music video directed by Kieran Khan. Nena earned Yendry international success, thanks also to the addition of the song to popular Spotify Latino playlists.  In September 2020 she performed Nena and Barrio for ColorsxStudios, both performances were a great success collecting millions of views. She was approached by Sony Music Latin and RCA Records, with whom she signed a double recording contract and announced the news in October 2020. Her first single with RCA Records and Sony Music Latin, El Diablo, was released on October 30, 2020. The song is a trilingual song written in English, Spanish and Italian by Yendry herself and produced by MAX JAEGER & SANTELL. Yendry recorded the song in Los Angeles a couple of months before the release. The video for the single was directed by Alberto Chimenti Dezani and shot in Turin. El Diablo has been acclaimed by prominent international music outlets including Billboard . Also that year, Yendry moved to Miami.

2021-present : The mini documentary En El Patio, the performance for the 2021 Latin AMAs and the 2022 nomination for the 2022 Premio Lo Nuestro

On February 5, 2021, she released the mini documentary En El Patio directed by Kieran Khan. The documentary was filmed in Herrera, Santo Domingo Oeste, the neighborhood where Yendry grew up and where her grandmother and part of her family still live. The documentary is a narrative of Yendry's Dominican origins and her journey to Italy with her mother. Also on February 5, 2021, the single Se Acabo is released featuring the Dominican rapper Mozart La Para. The song is written by Yendry together Mozart La Para, it was produced by XAXO and Fux Beat, the video for the single was shot in Herrera. In February 2021 she performed for Vevo Discovery with the singles El Diablo and Se Acabo. On April 15, 2021, she's one of the performers for the Latin American Music Awards of 2021 where she performed her debut single El Barrio. On May 21, 2021, she announced the collaboration with the Spanish fashion brand Desigual for the campaign Desigual x Esteban Cortázar.  On May 28, 2021, she released the single YA written by herself and produced by Federico Vindver. The song is an exhortation to self-confidence. The video directed by Kieran Khan, was shot in Medellín in Colombia near Cauca River. In December 2021, the single YA was selected by The New York Times as one of the best song of 2021 and is also part of Barack Obama's 2021 Spotify Playlist.  In June 2021 her collaboration with the Emotional Oranges for the song No Words was released. On June 7, 2021, she was nominated as best new artists at the 2021 MTV Millennial Awards. On August 6, 2021, she released the single You featuring Damian Marley On November 19, 2021, she released Instinto with J Balvin, the song written by Yendry herself and J Balvin is produced by Lexus & Keityn and the music video for the song was filmed in New York directed by José Emilio Sagaró. On January 14, 2022, she was part of Hotel Transylvania: Transformania soundtrack with the song Love Is Not Hard to Find. On January 28, 2022, she released together Lous and the Yakuza the single Mascarade for ColorsxStudios. On January 25, 2022, she was nominated in the category Best New Female artist for the 2022 Premio Lo Nuestro On May 6, 2022 she released the single KI-KI for which she shooted a video directed by herself, Christopher Hesketh and Becky Hern.

Musical influences 
Yendry's style is a mix between Bachata, Merengue, salsa, R&B and electro. 
Among her influences, as she stated herself, are the likes of Beyoncé, Ella Fitzgerald, Otis Redding, Etta James, Whitney Houston, Frank Ocean, James Blake, Yoskar Sarante and Juan Luis Guerra.

Discography

Singles

As Yendry
 2019 - "Barrio"
 2020 - "Nena"
 2020 - "El diablo"
 2021 - "Se acabo" (feat. Mozart La Para)
 2021 - "Ya"
 2021 - "You" (feat. Damian Marley)
 2021 - "Instinto" (with J Balvin)
 2022 - "Love Is Not Hard to Find"
 2022 - "Mascarade" (with Lous and the Yakuza)
 2022 - "KI-KI"
 2023 - "Herrera"

As Yendry Fiorentino
 2013 - "Here"

Materianera discography

EPs
 2015 - Supernova

Albums
 2018 - Abyss

Awards and nominations 

 2021 - MTV Millennial Awards - Best New Artist - nominee
 2022 - Premio Lo Nuestro - Best New Female artist - nominee

References

External links
Official website

Living people
1993 births
21st-century Dominican Republic women singers
People from Santo Domingo
Musicians from Turin
Latin music songwriters
Urbano musicians
Latin R&B singers
Sony Music artists
RCA Records artists
Sony Music Latin artists
Women in Latin music